The 2017–18 Croatian Women's Football Cup was the twenty seventh season of the annual Croatian football cup competition. Fourteen teams participated in the competition, all ten teams from the 2017–18 Croatian Women's First Football League and four teams from second level that applied for competition. The competition began on 21 October 2017 with the first of four rounds and ended on 10 June 2018 with the final at the Gradski stadion in Otočac, a nominally neutral venue. Osijek were defending champions, having won the cup in the previous eleven editions. They were eliminated by ŽNK Split in the quarter-finals who went on to win the cup for the first time after beating Agram in the finals.

Matches

Round of 16

Quarter-finals

Semi-finals

Final

References

External links
Competition rules 
Result overview (page 25) 

2017 in Croatian women's sport
2018 in Croatian women's sport
Women's football in Croatia
Football competitions in Croatia